Hahne is a German surname. Notable people with the surname include:

 Hans Hahne (disambiguation), several persons
 Hendrik Hahne (born 1986), German footballer
 Hubert Hahne (born 1935), racing driver
 Heribert Hahne (born 1938), Tour Operator (HFT)
 Robert Hahne (born 1898), Teacher, artist and musician

See also 
 C. Hahne Mühlenwerke GmbH & Co. KG, a German company producing cereals
 Hahne and Company, an American department store chain
 Hahnemühle, a German company producing paper
 Hahn (disambiguation)
 Hahnemann 
 Hanneman
 Haan (surname)

German-language surnames